The 2011 European Juniors Wrestling Championships was held in Zrenjanin, Serbia 21–26 June 2011.

Medal table

Team ranking

Medal summary

Men's freestyle

Men's Greco-Roman

Women's freestyle

References

External links
Official website

Wrestling
European Wrestling Juniors Championships
Sports competitions in Serbia
International wrestling competitions hosted by Serbia